Delplanqueia is a genus of snout moths. It was described by Patrice J.A. Leraut in 2001.

Species
 Delplanqueia cortella (Constant, 1884)
 Delplanqueia dilutella (Denis & Schiffermuller, 1775)
 Delplanqueia enderleini (Rebel, 1934)
 Delplanqueia inscriptella (Duponchel, 1836)
 Delplanqueia nobilella (Ragonot, 1887)

References

Phycitini
Pyralidae genera